Bronx Maternity Hospital was a growing medical facility which was heralded "POOR TO BE TREATED FREE: Forty Beds to be Devoted Exclusively to Mothers and Ailing Children" in 1920 when they outgrew their prior location.

History
From a 1914 MATERNITY HOSPITAL FAIR to a 1920 dedication "attended by a thousand or more men and women" they grew. In 1930 The New York Times headlined "Maternity Institution Plans a $1,000,000 Structure"

Twenty one years later a "Building Plans Filed" headline followed. They have since closed.

References

  

Defunct hospitals in the Bronx
History of the Bronx